Elizna Naudé (born 14 September 1978) is a South African discus thrower.

Her personal best throw is 64.87 metres, achieved in March 2007 in Stellenbosch.  She is a teacher at Vaalpark Primary School, Sasolburg, South Africa.

She is an alumna of the University of Pretoria.

International competitions

References

External links 

1978 births
Living people
Afrikaner people
South African female discus throwers
Olympic athletes of South Africa
Athletes (track and field) at the 2004 Summer Olympics
Athletes (track and field) at the 2008 Summer Olympics
Commonwealth Games gold medallists for South Africa
Commonwealth Games medallists in athletics
Athletes (track and field) at the 2002 Commonwealth Games
Athletes (track and field) at the 2006 Commonwealth Games
Athletes (track and field) at the 2010 Commonwealth Games
World Athletics Championships athletes for South Africa
University of Pretoria alumni
African Games gold medalists for South Africa
African Games medalists in athletics (track and field)
Athletes (track and field) at the 1999 All-Africa Games
Athletes (track and field) at the 2003 All-Africa Games
Athletes (track and field) at the 2007 All-Africa Games
Athletes (track and field) at the 2011 All-Africa Games
Medallists at the 2006 Commonwealth Games